Signy Arctander (26 October 1895 – 23 September 1971) was a Norwegian statistician and economist. She was born in Bergen, a daughter of politician Sofus Arctander. She was appointed at the Statistics Norway from 1920, and worked for this institution until her retirement in 1965; from 1960 to 1963 as acting director. Among her research works are Miljøundersøkelse for Oslo from 1928, two reports on the situation of children, and the study Arbeidsvilkår for hushjelp from 1937. She was decorated Knight, First Class of the Order of St. Olav in 1966.

References

1895 births
1971 deaths
Scientists from Bergen
Norwegian economists
Norwegian women economists
Norwegian statisticians
Women statisticians